The 2013 season was the Washington Redskins' 82nd in the National Football League (NFL). They failed to improve on their 10–6 regular season record from 2012, and suffered through a 3–13 season, which was the worst record that the team had posted since 1994, resulting in the firing of head coach Mike Shanahan and most of his staff after four seasons.

The 2013 Redskins were notable for having one of the worst special teams units in league history, and this played a major role in several of their losses. Football Outsiders listed the 2013 Redskins as having the second-worst special teams unit they had ever tracked.

Offseason

Signings

Re-signings

Departures

2013 draft class

Notes
 The team traded its first-round selection (No. 22 overall) in 2013, along with its first- and second-round selections in 2012 and its and 2014 first-round selection to the St. Louis Rams in exchange for the Rams' 2012 first-round selection.
 The team acquired this fifth-round selection in a  trade that sent defensive tackle Albert Haynesworth to the New England Patriots.

Staff

Final roster

Schedule

Preseason
The Redskins' finished the preseason going undefeated for the first time since the 1985 preseason.

Regular season

Note: Intra-division opponents are in bold text.

Game summaries

Week 1: vs. Philadelphia Eagles

With the much-anticipated return of quarterback Robert Griffin III, Washington began its 2013 campaign on Monday Night Football against the Chip Kelly coached Philadelphia Eagles, seeking a third straight win against Philadelphia.

Philadelphia got the ball first, and approached Washington's red zone, however Eagles quarterback Michael Vick threw a backward pass that was ruled a fumble, and recovered by Redskins cornerback DeAngelo Hall who raced to the opposite end zone to give Washington a 7–0 lead. The Eagles got the ball back, and moved into scoring range, but could not punch it in and settled for an Alex Henery 48-yard field goal to cut the Redskins' lead to 7–3. Washington's offense finally possessed the ball, but running back Alfred Morris fumbled, giving possession right back to Philadelphia. Vick would make Washington pay, finding wide receiver DeSean Jackson for a 25-yard touchdown, and a 10–7 Eagles lead. After a poor kick return, Washington found themselves backed up in their own end, and Griffin and Morris exchanged a poor option pitch, and Morris fumbled in the end zone, forced to fall on it and giving Philadelphia a safety. The first quarter ended without any further scoring, and Philadelphia led 12–7.

In the second, Washington's offense continued to sputter, and Philadelphia's offense continued to click. Vick would find tight end Brent Celek for a 28-yard score, and Vick would, after another Redskins punt, run for a 3-yard score to go up 26–7 as the teams headed to the locker room. Philadelphia's offense gained 331 yards of total offense in the first half alone.

Washington got the ball to start the third, and on the third play from scrimmage, Griffin III threw an ill-advised pass to Santana Moss, and was intercepted again. Philadelphia would score again, with running back LeSean McCoy racing for a 34-yard score and a 33–7 Philadelphia lead. Washington finally got their offense moving, but their drive went for naught, as Kai Forbath, who missed only one field goal in all of 2012, missed. Philadelphia punted again, and on Washington's ensuing possession, they were able to finish a drive. With seconds remaining in the third, Morris scored from 5 yards out, to cut the Philadelphia advantage to 33–14.

After a Philadelphia punt in the fourth, Washington's offense gained possession again. A solid, methodical drive ensued, with Griffin finding Leonard Hankerson for a 10-yard score, but a failed two-point conversion left the score at 33–20. After another Philadelphia punt, Washington got the ball back again, but could not convert a 4th-and-15, as Aldrick Robinson could not haul in the pass. Philadelphia was able to wind the majority of the clock down, but not all of it. Washington got the ball back again, and Griffin found Hankerson a second time to cut the score to 33–27. Needing an onside kick recovery to finish their comeback, it fell short as Jason Avant fell on the kick, and Philadelphia knelt down to seal their win.

With the loss, Washington began the season 0–1 for the first time since 2009, lost their home opener for a second consecutive year, lost to Philadelphia for the first time since 2011, fell to 0–1 in the NFC East, and lost a regular season game for the first time since Week 9 of last season against Carolina.

Week 2: at Green Bay Packers

Coming off their season-opening loss to Philadelphia, Washington traveled to historic Lambeau Field to take on the Aaron Rodgers-led Green Bay Packers in a battle of defending division champions and also the first meeting between these two teams since Week 5 of 2010. This meeting marked the 30th anniversary of their meeting on October 17, 1983, in which Green Bay beat Washington 48–47 in the highest-scoring Monday Night Football game in history (although October 17 fell on a Thursday in 2013, the NFL ultimately did not schedule the teams to meet that night).

Green Bay got possession first, and Washington's defense was able to stiffen once Green Bay got deep into their territory, and the Packers settled for a Mason Crosby 28-yard field goal. After a Washington three-and-out, Green Bay drove into field goal range, but on 4th-and-3, instead of punting or kicking a long field goal, Rodgers found wide receiver Randall Cobb for a 35-yard touchdown to extend the Green Bay advantage to 10–0.

Washington's struggles would continue, both offensively and defensively, in the second. Rodgers connected with Jordy Nelson for a 15-yard score to make Green Bay's advantage 17–0. Green Bay would score yet again, this time by Rodgers finding Jermichael Finley for a 3-yard score to make it 24–0. Washington finally got a drive going offensively, but after opting to not test new placekicker John Potter, who was filling in for an injured Kai Forbath, Washington could not convert a fourth down, and Green Bay began driving yet again. Washington got a reprieve, however, when Randall Cobb, extending for the pylon to try to make it 31–0 right before halftime, lost control of the ball, fumbled at the pylon, awarding the ball to Washington by way of a touchback, finishing the first half scoring at 24–0 Green Bay.

Washington got the ball to start the third, and got into field goal range again. This time, they tested Potter from 50 yards, and he was well wide of the mark, and Green Bay took possession again. Green Bay would continue to take it to Washington, as Rodgers connected with Nelson once more, to make it 31–0 Green Bay. Washington got the ball back and was finally able to respond, with quarterback Robert Griffin III connecting with Pierre Garçon for a 6-yard score to cut the deficit to 31–7. Any hopes of a comeback were stumped out, however, when Packers running back James Starks raced past defenders into the end zone for a 32-yard score to put the advantage up to 38–7.

In the fourth, Washington tried to rally and was once again able to sustain its offense, once again, when the game was either out of reach or close to it. Griffin found rookie tight end Jordan Reed for a 3-yard score. After a Green Bay punt, Washington scored again, this time by way of Griffin floating a pass to the corner of the end zone for veteran wide receiver Santana Moss to cut the deficit to 38–20. Needing a two-point conversion to cut the deficit to two scores, Washington failed in this endeavor, and kicked the ball back to Green Bay. After two stops on first and second down, Rodgers went back to the air on 3rd-and-9, and connected with James Jones, and Washington never saw the ball again. Green Bay ran out the clock and preserved the 38–20 win.

With the loss, Washington fell to 0–2 for the first time since 2006, and remained in the NFC East Cellar. Washington also allowed Green Bay to have a 100-yard rusher. The last time Green Bay had a 100-yard rusher was in Week 5 of the 2010 season, also against Washington, when Brandon Jackson racked up over 100 yards on the Redskins, although Washington won that game. Green Bay set a franchise record, as Aaron Rodgers' 480 passing yards tied Matt Flynn for the most in a game, and James Starks' 100-yard rushing performance snapped a 44-game streak of games without a 100-yard rusher for Green Bay. This was also the first time in Packers history that they had a 400-yard passer and 100-yard rusher in the same game.

Week 3: vs. Detroit Lions

Coming off their road loss to Green Bay, Washington returned home for a duel at FedExField with the Detroit Lions, matching up with them for the first time since 2010, but the first time in DC since 2007.

After teams exchanged punts in the first, Washington struck first when Lions quarterback Matthew Stafford was intercepted by Redskins cornerback DeAngelo Hall who returned the interception 9 yards for a 7–0 Washington lead.
Detroit responded right away, however, as running back Joique Bell broke numerous tackles on his way to a 12-yard touchdown, evening the score at 7–7. The first quarter would conclude without any further scoring.

Early in the second, Detroit finished off a drive with Stafford finding tight end Joseph Fauria for a 5-yard score to give Detroit the 14–7 lead. Later in the second, after a few missed opportunities by both teams, Redskins running back Alfred Morris took off for a 30-yard score, evening the score at 14–14 late in the second. Washington's much-maligned defense, however, could not hold it and Detroit retook the lead before halftime thanks to a David Akers 32-yard field goal, giving Detroit a 17–14 edge and halfway to its first win ever in Washington.

Early in the third, Washington was able to equalize with John Potter making his first career field goal from 43 yards out.
Both teams failed to score again, and the teams went into the final quarter tied at 17.

Early in the fourth, Detroit took the lead again, this time by way of Akers hitting a 28-yard field goal, giving Detroit a 20–17 lead. On Washington's ensuing possession, it appeared as if Washington took the lead, as Robert Griffin III found wide receiver Aldrick Robinson for a 57-yard score and an apparent 24–20 lead. However, upon video replay, it showed Robinson was bobbling the ball as he fell to the ground, thus the apparent pass was ruled incomplete, and Washington could not score again, punting. Detroit marched down the field and all but sealed the deal, as Stafford connected with superstar Calvin Johnson with just under four minutes remaining in the game. Washington didn't give up, however, and John Potter connected from 21 yards out to cut the lead to 27–20. However, after not recovering the onside kick, Washington needed to stop Detroit. They did this, and got the ball back with just under 50 seconds remaining. Washington got to midfield, but Griffin's hail mary pass was off the mark, and Washington lost once again.

With the loss. Washington fell to 0–3 for the first time since 2001, and also lost to the Detroit Lions for the third straight time, having not beaten them since 2008 when they didn't even manage to win a single game. However, Washington lost to Detroit at home for the first time since 1935, when they were still the Boston Redskins. They had never, prior to this day, lost to Detroit in Washington or Landover.

Week 4: at Oakland Raiders

Coming off their third straight loss, Washington traveled to Oakland to play the Oakland Raiders for the first time since 2009.

Washington got the ball to start the game, and punted. Oakland then followed with a punt, too. Washington went three-and-out yet again, but this time, Saverio Rocca's punt was blocked by Raiders running back Rashad Jennings and recovered by fellow Raiders running back Jeremy Stewart in the end zone for a Raiders touchdown and a 7–0 lead. Washington could not respond, and when Oakland got the ball again, quarterback Matt Flynn, filling in for concussed quarterback Terrelle Pryor found rookie tight end Mychal Rivera (brother of Glee star Naya Rivera) for a 31-yard score and a 14–0 Raiders lead.

Needing a spark, Washington switched to a hurry-up offense for their next drive, and sustained one for the first time on the day. It stalled when it reached the red zone, however, and Washington placekicker John Potter hit a 25-yard chip shot to cut the deficit to 14–3. Later in the quarter, Matt Flynn threw a pass that was intercepted by cornerback David Amerson and returned 45 yards for a score and the deficit was 14–10. The teams were not able to do much else, and the halves concluded with this score at 14–10.

In the third, both offenses continued to struggle, but late in the third, Washington quarterback Robert Griffin III found wide receiver Pierre Garçon for a 5-yard score, and Washington's first lead in the second half of a game all season.

In the fourth, Oakland's offense continued to sputter, even fumbling for a second time at midfield. Washington was able to sustain a running game in spite of an injury to star running back Alfred Morris, with typical third-down back Roy Helu, Jr. running into the end zone from 14 yards out to increase Washington's lead to 24–14. Oakland could not rally, and Washington held on for its first win.

With the win, Washington improved to 1–3 and heads into the bye week, reconvening on NBC Sunday Night Football for a clash with Dallas in two weeks. This was Washington's third consecutive win against an AFC opponent.

Week 6: at Dallas Cowboys

Week 7: vs. Chicago Bears

Week 8: at Denver Broncos

This was head coach Mike Shanahan's first return to Denver in 5 years since his dismissal from the organization following the 2008 season. Shanahan previously served as the Broncos head coach from 1995–2008, led the team to back-to-back Super Bowl titles in 1998 and 1999, and is the franchise's winningest head coach with a total of 146 games won. In a sluggish game that saw 9 combined turnovers by each team, Washington would lead 21-7 at one point, but the Broncos would score 38 straight points to win 45-21. The Redskins were outscored 31-0 in the 4th quarter.

Week 9: vs. San Diego Chargers

Week 10: at Minnesota Vikings

Week 11: at Philadelphia Eagles

Week 12: vs. San Francisco 49ers

Week 13: vs. New York Giants

With the loss on a questionable call by the officials, the Redskins were officially eliminated from playoff contention.

Week 14: vs. Kansas City Chiefs

Washington got into a hole in which they could not climb out of, as they trailed as big as 38-0 and scored all their points in the second quarter.

Week 15: at Atlanta Falcons

Leading up to the game, the Redskins were criticized by many after Mike Shanahan decided to bench Robert Griffin III for Kirk Cousins for their game against the Falcons. Shanahan said that he decided to bench Griffin because he did not want him to be hurt again in a lost season. Trailing 27-20 in the 4th quarter late, Cousins led them down the field to score a touchdown, but the Redskins decided to go for 2 for the win instead of the tie. The 2-point attempt failed and the Falcons won 27-26. Griffin was benched for the rest of the season.

Week 16: vs. Dallas Cowboys

Trying to play spoiler, the Redskins hosted the Dallas Cowboys and attempted to spoil their playoff chances. Leading 23-17 late, the Redskins looked poised to pull out the upset, but the Cowboys would score with just under a minute left and won 24-23.

Week 17: at New York Giants

With the loss, the Redskins finished in last place in NFC. They would also be the only team this season to be swept by all of its division rivals.

Standings

Division

Conference

Honors
Four Redskins were selected to be on the NFL Network's list of the Top 100 Players of 2013. Robert Griffin III is ranked at #15, Alfred Morris at #64, London Fletcher at #86, and Trent Williams at #99.

Trent Williams, Brian Orakpo and Alfred Morris were selected to the 2014 Pro Bowl.

References

External links
 
 2013 Washington Redskins season at ESPN

Washington
Washington Redskins seasons
Red